KRBX, branded as Radio Boise, is a listener-supported, independent community radio station headquartered in Boise, Idaho, United States, broadcasting at 89.9 FM and 93.5 FM (on translator K228EK), presenting a freeform radio format. The station is operated by the non-profit Boise Community Radio Project and was established in 2011. Its main terrestrial transmitter is located in the Owyhee Mountains of eastern Oregon, and its city of license is Caldwell, Idaho, with a translator in downtown Boise (licensed to Garden City). It can be heard worldwide on the internet via streaming formats at radioboise.org.

See also
List of community radio stations in the United States

External links

RBX
Freeform radio stations
Community radio stations in the United States
Radio stations established in 2011